Jorris Romil (born 27 December 1994) is a professional footballer who plays as a forward for Championnat National 2 club Trélissac. Born in metropolitan France, he represents Guadeloupe at international level.

Club career
Romil started football at the age of 12 and was part of the Reims academy, leaving at the age of 19 because of disagreements with the club and moved to the lower divisions in France. Romil made his professional debut for Valenciennes in a 1–1 Ligue 2 tie with Gazélec Ajaccio on 28 July 2017.

Romil was loaned to Les Herbiers on 2 January 2018.

On the last day of the 2019–20 winter transfer window, Romil was released from his contract by Valenciennes and signed a deal with Dunkerque, initially until the end of the season, but with an option to extend for another season.

International career
On 23 March 2019, Romil made his debut for the Guadeloupe national team in a CONCACAF Nations League qualifier against Martinique, as a starter.

Honours 
Les Herbiers

 Coupe de France runner-up: 2017–18

References

External links
 
 
 
 Valenciennes Profile
 Bordeaux Profile
 

1994 births
Living people
People from Creil
Association football forwards
Guadeloupean footballers
Guadeloupe international footballers
French footballers
French people of Guadeloupean descent
Stade de Reims players
JA Drancy players
Sablé FC (France) players
FC Girondins de Bordeaux players
Valenciennes FC players
Les Herbiers VF players
USL Dunkerque players
FC Chambly Oise players
Trélissac FC players
Ligue 2 players
Championnat National players
Championnat National 2 players
Championnat National 3 players
Sportspeople from Oise
Footballers from Hauts-de-France
Black French sportspeople